Oppeano is a city (municipality) in the Province of Verona in the Italian region Veneto, located about  west of Venice and about  southeast of Verona.

Climate
The climate is subtropical humid, with cool winters, with rare snowfall, and summers are very hot and humid. There are many types of palm trees, a path of subtropical climate, although still not missing the snow.

Twin towns
  Montegranaro, Italy
  Mereto di Tomba, Italy

References

External links
 Official website

Cities and towns in Veneto